Rasta Peth is an oldest neighbourhood located in the city of Pune, India. The name is derived from the name of Raste who was a relative of Peshwa’s in the Maratha Empire.

Rasta Peth is a centralized location in the city. Places such as Pune Railway Station, Camp, Shaniwar Wada, Dagadusheth Halwai Ganapati Temple, Laxmi road, Bund Garden are hardly 10 minutes apart.

References

Peths in Pune